Alan John Williams (14 October 1930 – 21 December 2014) was a British Labour Party politician who served as Member of Parliament (MP) for Swansea West for over 45 years, from 1964 to 2010. He was the longest serving MP for a Welsh constituency since David Lloyd George and built a reputation for his detailed scrutiny of the ways in which public money was spent.

Early life
Williams was born in Caerphilly, the son of Emlyn, a former miner who became a local government officer, and Violet (née Ross). He was educated at Cardiff High School for Boys (a state grammar school) then Cardiff College of Technology and Commerce when he gained a BSc in economics in 1954 (awarded by the University of London). At University College, Oxford, he studied PPE. He became an economics lecturer at the Welsh College of Advanced Technology then a broadcaster and journalist.

Member of Parliament for Swansea West
He unsuccessfully contested Poole in 1959, coming second to  Conservative incumbent Richard Pilkington. Shortly afterwards he was selected as the candidate for Swansea West which had been won by the Conservatives by a narrow majority of 403 votes. 

The constituency, containing the city centre, the university and the relatively prosperous western suburbs, had historically been a marginal one for Labour, in contrast to the more working-class Swansea East. Percy Morris, elected in the Labour landslide of 1945 had seen his majority cut to just over a thousand votes in 1955 before he was ousted by the Conservative Hugh Rees four years later. Williams recaptured the seat in 1964, and held it for nearly 46 years. However, it was never entirely safe, and Rees made two unsuccessful attempts to recapture the seat in 1966 and in 1970. Williams had a very tight contest at the 1979 election, in the wake of the "winter of discontent" and divisions in the Welsh Labour Party over devolution. He held on by only 401 votes – only two less than the Tory majority he had overturned in 1964. 

His majorities thereafter were more secure but the fact that the Liberal Democrats came close to winning the seat after his retirement in 2010 suggests that he had a substantial personal vote.

Parliamentary career
Williams served under Harold Wilson as Under-Secretary of State for Economic Affairs from 1967 until 1969 and then as a Parliamentary Secretary at the Ministry of Technology until 1970 when Labour lost power. When Labour were returned to power at the February 1974 general election, Williams was made Minister of State at the Department of Prices and Consumer Protection, serving until Wilson left office in 1976. The new Prime Minister, James Callaghan, then appointed him as Minister of State at the Department of Industry in which post he served until Labour lost power to the Conservatives under Margaret Thatcher in the 1979 general election.

Williams was made a Privy Counsellor in 1977. He was a backbencher from 1989 to 2010, and chairman of the Liaison Committee from 2001 to 2010. He was a Eurosceptic and was opposed to the devolution settlement that established the National Assembly for Wales.

In 2003, he abstained on the parliamentary approval for the invasion of Iraq.

Father of the House
Following the retirement of Tam Dalyell at the 2005 general election, Williams became the MP with the longest continuous service in the House, earning him the title of Father of the House.

He was the last MP to question Prime Minister Tony Blair at Prime Minister's Questions on 27 June 2007. He congratulated Blair for giving the Labour Party 10 years of government, called him one of the outstanding Prime Ministers of his time, and thanked him for making the Labour Party once again the "natural party of government".

Williams was the last parliamentary survivor of those who were elected in Wilson's 1964 election win. As Father of the House, Williams presided over the Commons Speaker election on 22 June 2009. He stood down from the Commons at the 2010 general election.

Personal life
He married (Mary) Patricia Rees in June 1957 in Bedwellty. They had two sons and a daughter, Sian.

Death
He died at the age of 84 on 21 December 2014. He was in a nursing home in London after having a stroke six months prior to his death.

References

External links
 Guardian Unlimited Politics – Ask Aristotle: Alan Williams MP
 TheyWorkForYou.com – Alan Williams MP
 Ministerial posts
 BBC Politics

News items
 Remembrance Sunday service intervention October 2001
 Becomes Father of the House in 2005

|-

1930 births
2014 deaths
Alumni of Cardiff Metropolitan University
Alumni of University College, Oxford
Members of the Parliament of the United Kingdom for Swansea constituencies
Members of the Privy Council of the United Kingdom
Ministers in the Wilson governments, 1964–1970
People from Caerphilly
Transport Salaried Staffs' Association-sponsored MPs
UK MPs 1964–1966
UK MPs 1966–1970
UK MPs 1970–1974
UK MPs 1974
UK MPs 1974–1979
UK MPs 1979–1983
UK MPs 1983–1987
UK MPs 1987–1992
UK MPs 1992–1997
UK MPs 1997–2001
UK MPs 2001–2005
UK MPs 2005–2010
Welsh Labour Party MPs